This list contains the top 30 tweets with the most likes on the social networking platform Twitter. Twitter does not provide a full official list, but news and mainstream media often cover the topic. Five accounts have more than one of the most-liked tweets in the top 30: South Korean band BTS has 17, while former U.S. president Barack Obama, current U.S. president Joe Biden, business magnate Elon Musk, and environmental activist Greta Thunberg each have two.

Top 30 
The following table lists the top 30 most-liked tweets on Twitter, the account that tweeted it, the total number of likes rounded down to the nearest hundred thousand, and the date it was originally tweeted. Tweets that have an identical number of likes are listed in date order with the most recent tweet ranked highest. The notes provide the details surrounding the tweet.

See also

 List of most-disliked YouTube videos
 List of most-followed Twitter accounts
 List of most-liked Instagram posts
 List of most-liked YouTube videos
 List of most-retweeted tweets
 List of most-subscribed YouTube channels

References

Lists of Internet-related superlatives
Twitter tweets
Twitter-related lists